Sány is a municipality and village in Nymburk District in the Central Bohemian Region of the Czech Republic. It has about 600 inhabitants.

Geography
It lies in a flat and mostly agricultural landscape in the Central Elbe Table. The municipality is situated on the left bank of the Cidlina River.

History
The first written mention of Sány is from 1352, when it was listed as property of the monastery in Mnichovo Hradiště.

Transport
The D11 motorway (part of the European route E67) from Prague to Hradec Králové leads across the municipality.

The railway line Kolín–Trutnov passes through the municipal territory, but the station named Sány is located in neighbouring Opolánky.

Sights
There are no buildings protected as cultural monuments. The landmark of Sány is the Church of Saint Andrew. It is a modern Empire style church built in 1827, after the old local Gothic church was demolished in 1824.

Notable people
Jan Čapek of Sány (c. 1390 – c. 1452), nobleman and military officer

References

External links

Villages in Nymburk District